Tillie the Toiler is a newspaper comic strip created by cartoonist Russ Westover who initially worked on his concept of a flapper character in a strip he titled Rose of the Office. With a title change, it sold to King Features Syndicate which carried the strip from January 3, 1921, to March 15, 1959.

The daily strip began on Monday, January 3, 1921, followed by the Sunday page on October 10, 1922.

Westover retired in 1951 with his assistant Bob Gustafson then doing most of the writing and drawing. After Westover departed completely three years later, Gustafson's signature appeared on the strip beginning October 4, 1954. The daily strip ended March 7, 1959, with the last Sunday eight days later on March 15.

Characters and story
Stylish working girl Tillie was employed as a stenographer, secretary and part-time model. An attractive brunette, she had no problem finding men to escort her around town. Comics historian Don Markstein described the story situations:

Toppers
For the Sunday page, Westover produced a series of topper strips, starting with Kitty Change-Her-Mind (Jan 10–March 14, 1926) and The Counter Kids (March 21–May 2, 1926).

On May 9, 1926, Westover began a topper series that would run for two decades – first called The Van Zippers (May 9–Aug 15, 1926), then The Van Swaggers (Aug 22, 1926 – June 26, 1938) and finally The Van Swaggers Starring Aunt Min (July 3, 1938 – 1943?)

A paper-doll panel, Tillie the Toiler's Fashion Parade, appeared next to the topper from April 24, 1932, until 1951.

Reprints
Cupples & Leon collected the strips into book form in 1925, followed by seven other books in that series. Dell Comics reprinted the strip in 14 issues between 1941 and 1949. Tillie the Toiler and the Masquerading Duchess was a novel published by Whitman in 1943.

Films
The comic strip inspired two films of the same name: Tillie the Toiler (1927), a silent film with Marion Davies in the title role, and Tillie the Toiler (1941), starring Kay Harris.

References

External links
Christopher Wheeler: Tillie the Toiler books
"See You in the Funnies" by Barbara Erdman

American comic strips
1921 comics debuts
Fictional American people
1959 comics endings
Gag-a-day comics
American comics characters
Comics characters introduced in 1921
Comics about women
Female characters in comics
American comics adapted into films
Flappers